Sar Chal (also Romanized as Sar Chāl) is a village in Pol-e Doab Rural District, Zalian District, Shazand County, Markazi Province, Iran. At the 2006 census, its population was 613, in 139 families.

References 

Populated places in Shazand County